A good day to die is an expression of unclear historical origin signifying bravery.

A Good Day to Die, It Is a Good Day to Die, or Today Is a Good Day to Die may also refer to:

Music
A Good Day to Die, an album by Sam Llanas
"Good Day to Die", a song by Godsmack from The Oracle
"Good Day to Die", a song by Hot Hot Heat from Happiness Ltd.
"Today Is a Good Day to Die", a song by Manowar from Louder Than Hell
"It Is a Good Day to Die", a song by Robbie Robertson from Music for The Native Americans
"Good Day to Die", a song by Travis from Good Feeling
"A Good Day to Die", a song by Venom from Metal Black
"Good Day to Die", a song by Wednesday 13 from Fang Bang
"It's a Good Day to Die", a song from Starship Troopers 3: Marauder
"Good Day to Die", a song by Exodus from Force of Habit

Other uses
"A Good Day to Die" (episode), a 2007 episode of Robin Hood
A Good Day to Die (film), a 2010 American documentary film about American Indian Movement activist Dennis Banks
Children of the Dust (miniseries) or A Good Day to Die, a 1995 television miniseries starring Sidney Poitier
A Good Day to Die, a novel by Jim Harrison
A Good Day to Die, a novel by Simon Kernick

See also
Crazy Horse (c. 1840–1877), Lakota leader to whom the quotation is often inaccurately attributed
"A Fine Day to Die", a song by Bathory from Blood Fire Death
A Good Day to Die Hard, a 2013 film starring Bruce Willis
Life: Today Is a Very Good Day to Die, an album by Kra
Little Big Man (film), a 1970 film notably featuring the line
Not a Good Day to Die, a book by Sean Naylor